Bukit Katil was a federal constituency in Malacca, Malaysia, that was represented in the Dewan Rakyat from 2004 to 2018.

The federal constituency was created in the 2003 redistribution and was mandated to return a single member to the Dewan Rakyat under the first past the post voting system.

History
It was abolished in 2018 when it was redistributed.

Representation history

State constituency

Election results

References

Defunct Malacca federal constituencies